Dominion is an Australian documentary film released in 2018 by animal rights  activist Chris Delforce. The film seeks to portray some animal agricultural practices by using alleged footage secretly filmed using hidden cameras and aerial drones. The film focuses on six topics: farmed animals, wild animals, companion animals, entertainment animals, fur animals, and animal experimentation.

The film, and its related Dominion movement, is managed by an animal protection and animal rights organisation, Farm Transparency Project, previously known as Aussie Farms. The movie was filmed to be a feature-length documentary sequel to Lucent (2014), which mostly focused on the Australian pig farming industry.

Synopsis 
Dominion describes, in 18 chapters, how different animal species are used and misused in different ways. The film is divided into segments covering different species: pigs, laying hens and meat chickens, turkeys, ducks, cows, sheep, goats, fish, rabbits, mink, foxes, dogs, horses, camels, mice, exotic animals, seals and dolphins, and a conclusion from the narrators.

Production 
The documentary was produced as part of two crowdfunding campaigns that raised US$19,796 and €57,710, respectively, and it received funding from the Australian animal rights organization Voiceless. 
The film features narration by the actors Joaquin Phoenix, Rooney Mara and Sadie Sink, as well as the singer Sia. It premiered in Melbourne on 29 March 2018.

Reception 
Animal rights activists have called it a powerful documentary. It has been called the "New Earthlings," and has the joint support of many local animal rights groups.

Animal rights activists participated in the temporary shutdown of a slaughterhouse in Benalla, Victoria, on 26 March, to coincide with the film's premiere in Melbourne. On 8 April 2019, a series of protest actions were held across Australia to mark the one-year anniversary of the film. Protests included the storming of abattoirs and the halting of traffic at Melbourne's busiest intersection during peak hour. Activists held signs promoting the movie.

The Australian Meat Industry Council Chief Executive, Patrick Hutchinson, has said, "“What the film shows is not representative of the practices of the wider industry. The vast majority of businesses and the vast majority of their employees are deeply committed to ensuring the most humane experience possible for animals,"

See also 
 List of vegan media
 Earthlings

External links 
 
 
 Complete film on YouTube (official)

References 

2018 documentary films
Australian documentary films
Documentary films about agriculture
Documentary films about animal rights
2010s English-language films